Political theatre may refer to:

 Political drama, a theatrical genre
 Guerrilla theatre, a type of political protest with a theatrical quality
 Political posturing or Kabuki, political acts made only for the sake of appearance
 Political stunt, a type of publicity stunt intended to sway public opinion on a political issue